Tengzhou Olympic Centre Stadium is a football stadium in Tengzhou, China.  It hosts football matches and hosted some matches for the Women's Football competition at the 2009 National Games of China.  The stadium holds 30,000 spectators.

References

External links
Stadium information

Football venues in China
Sports venues in Shandong